Winning Losers: A Collection of Home Recordings 89-93 is an album by Lou Barlow, released as Louis Barlow's Acoustic Sentridoh in 1994 in the USA by Smells Like Records.

Critical reception

Rolling Stone deemed the album "nervously sweet hearth rock with strong madcap echoes of Syd Barrett." A later review in Rolling Stone, by Mark Kemp, wrote that "if you can take the occasional overpowering distortion, the emotional rewards are devastating." The New York Times called it "a benchmark of the [home recording] genre."

Track listing

(*) originally appeared on Losers, a Sentridoh cassette released by Shrimper.

References

1994 albums
Sentridoh albums